This is a list of Middle Eastern countries ranked by their Gross Domestic Product (GDP) for 2022, according to IMF.

Greater Middle East

Middle East
GDP